The 2022 World and European Wheelchair Handball Championship was the first edition of the tournament held in Leiria, Portugal from 18 to 20 November 2022.

The competition featured nine teams, i.e., the host, two from Asia and six  from Europe. The competition was played with mixed teams, i.e., each team must have at least three female players, while at least one female player per team must be on the court at any time.

Qualification

Disqualification of Pakistan
Because Pakistan entered the competition only with nine players (two women) instead of twelve players (three women) they were disqualified by the tournament management. They are allowed to play there games but all games will be counted as 0–10 lose and 0–2 points for the opponent.

Group A

Group B

Consolation round

Knockout stage

Bracket

Quarter-finals

Semi-finals

Fifth place game

Third place game

Final

Final ranking

World Championship

European Championship

References

Website

Wheelchair Handball World Championship
Wheelchair
International handball competitions hosted by Portugal
2022
Sport in Leiria
Wheelchair Handball World Championship
Wheelchair Handball World Championship